Knippers Helbig is an engineering company based in Stuttgart, New York City , and Berlin.

It was founded in 2001 and specializes in structural design and facade engineering of German and international construction projects involving high-rise buildings, steel and timber constructions, bridges, and airports. 
The company has worked in collaboration with architects such as Massimiliano Fuksas, Grimshaw Architects, Steven Holl, Renzo Piano, Diller Scofidio + Renfro, Barkow Leibinger, and Stefan Behnisch.

It focuses on development and programming related to complex parametrical or generated geometries of roof constructions as well as façades comprising steel and glass structures. An example of this manner of work by Knippers Helbig is the façade of the Shenzhen International Airport, which features 60,000 different façade units.

Knippers Helbig was responsible for the design and development of the largest membrane roof worldwide, which appeared at the 1,000 m long and 100 m wide main entrance building on the World-Exposition in Shanghai. The steel and glass structure of the shopping mall MyZeil in Frankfurt on the Main and the roofing of the shopping mall Westfield near London were both also the work of Knippers Helbig.

Outside of its designs in roofing and facades, Knippers Helbig has also begun experimenting with alternative materials in construction and is responsible for Europe's first road bridge consisting of fiber-glass-reinforced plastics.

Selected projects 
 2017: Trumpf Smart Factory, Chicago (USA)
 2013: Shenzhen International Airport, Shenzhen
 2013: Convention Center, Kigali
 2012: Theme Pavillon Expo 2012, Yeosu
 2010: Facades Dubai International Airport Concourse 2 + 3, Dubai
 2010: Jüberg-tower, Hemer
 2010: Expo Axis, Shanghai
 2010: Norwegian Pavillon, Expo Shanghai
 2010: Youth Center Stuttgart Bad-Cannstatt
 2009: Freeform Nutshell Westfield, London
 2009: United Nations Conference Center, Bonn
 2009: Centre des Sports et des Loisirs, Luxembourg-Belair
 2008: MyZeil, Frankfurt am Main
 2008: FRP Brücke, Friedberg
 2007: Commercial and Apartment building, Mainz
 2005: Flagship Store Peek & Cloppenburg, Köln
 2005: Center for Cellular and Biomolecular Research, Toronto

Competitions 
 2011: Quartier M Highrise in Düsseldorf with Jürgen Mayer H.: 1. Prize
 2011: Berlin Trade Fair with Wulf Architects: 2. Prize 
 2011: Lansberg Pedestrian Bridge: 1. Prize 
 2010: Kaohsiung Marine Gateway, Taiwan with Asymptote Architecture: 2. Prize
 2010: IBA Building Complex in Hamburg with Allmann Sattler Wappner Architekten: 1. Prize
 2010: Exhibition Hall and Station in Kirchberg, Luxembourg with Pohl Architekten Stadtplaner, and SteinmetzDemeyer, architectes urbanistes: 1. Prize
 2010: Central busstation, Kiel, with Giorgio Gulotta Architects: 2. Prize
 2010: Footbridge 'Margaretengürtel' in Vienna with Knight Architects: 1. Prize
 2010: Karlsplatz Stuttgart with Behnisch Architekten: 1. Prize
 2010: Wilhelmspalais in Stuttgart with Lederer+Ragnarsdóttir+Oei: 1. Prize
 2009: Train station Cessange, Luxembourg with Pohl Architekten und Steinmetzdemeyer: 2. Prize
 2009: Pedestrian Bridges, Opladen with Knight Architects: 1. Prize
 2008: Head office Wala Foundation with H4A Gessert Randecker Architekten: 1. Prize
 2008: Shenzhen International Airport with Massimiliano Fuksas: 1. Prize
 2007: Gewandhaus Dresden with Cheret Bozic: 1. Prize
 2004: Frankfurt International Airport Terminal 3 with Foster and Partners: 2. Prize

Gallery

External links 
 www.knippershelbig.com – Official Website

References 

Engineering companies of Germany
Construction and civil engineering companies of Germany
Construction and civil engineering companies established in 2001
German companies established in 2001